Beverly J. Stoeltje is a professor in both the Department of Folklore and Ethnomusicology and the Department of Anthropology at Indiana University (Bloomington). She also serves as Affiliated Faculty in African Studies, American Studies, Cultural Studies, Gender Studies, and at the Russian-East European Institute.

Stoeltje earned her B.S. in Education in 1961, from the University of Texas, Austin. She continued on at the University of Texas to pursue both her M.A. (1973) and her Ph.D. (1979) in Folklore (Folkloristics) within the graduate folklore program associated with the UT Department of Anthropology. Stoeltje's dissertation and early work was focused on the American West and, in particular, on her home state of Texas. She is well known as a student of Rodeo and associated forms of cultural performance. She has continued to pursue her initial interests in performance, ritual, and gender, but shifted her geographical interests in the early 1990s to Ghana and West Africa, exploring the role of Asante Queen Mothers (see Akan Chieftaincy). She has also expanded her inquiries to include the anthropologies of law and nationalism.

Representative Work
Stoeltje, Beverly. (1979) Children's Handclaps: Informal Learning in Play. Austin: Southwest Educational Development Laboratory.
Stoeltje, Beverly, Colleen Ballerino Cohen, and Richard Wilk, eds. (1995) Beauty Queens on the Global Stage: Gender, Contests and Power. New York: Routledge.

References

External links
Beverly Stoeltje's personal web page
Indiana University's Department of Folklore and Ethnomusicology
Indiana University's Department of Anthropology

Living people
Beauty pageants researchers
University of Texas at Austin College of Education alumni
Indiana University Bloomington faculty
Year of birth missing (living people)